Wei Gang, may refer to:

Wei Gang (PLA Navy), a vice admiral in the People's Liberation Army Navy.

, a major general in the People's Liberation Army Air Force.